Karakalpak Autonomous Oblast was created on February 19, 1925 by separating lands of the ethnic Karakalpaks from the Turkestan Autonomous Soviet Socialist Republic and Khorezm People's Soviet Republic.

Initially located within the Kirghiz Autonomous Socialist Soviet Republic (which was later renamed to Kazakh Autonomous Soviet Socialist Republic), the Karakalpak AO was transferred to the Russian Soviet Federative Socialist Republic from July 20, 1930 to March 20, 1932, at which time it was elevated to the Karakalpak Autonomous Soviet Socialist Republic (Karakalpak ASSR). The Karakalpak ASSR was joined to the Uzbek SSR from December 5, 1936.

See also
First Secretary of the Karakalpak Communist Party

Post–Russian Empire states
20th century in Uzbekistan
Autonomous oblasts of the Soviet Union
States and territories established in 1925
Geographic history of Uzbekistan
1925 establishments in the Soviet Union
1932 disestablishments in the Soviet Union